Prince Aage, Count of Rosenborg, (Aage Christian Alexander Robert; 10 June 1887 – 19 February 1940) was a Danish prince and officer of the French Foreign Legion. He was born in Copenhagen the eldest child and son of Prince Valdemar of Denmark and Princess Marie d'Orléans.

Early life

Prince Aage was born on 10 June 1887, in the Yellow Palace, an 18th-century town house at 18 Amaliegade, immediately adjacent to the Amalienborg Palace complex in Copenhagen. He was the first child of Prince Valdemar of Denmark, and his wife Princess Marie of Orléans. His father was a younger son of King Christian IX of Denmark and Louise of Hesse-Kassel, and his mother was the eldest daughter of Prince Robert, Duke of Chartres and Princess Françoise of Orléans. He was baptised with the names Aage Christian Alexander Robert, and was known as Prince Aage.

Prince Aage and his siblings grew up at the Yellow Palace in Copenhagen and at their parent's summer residence Bernstorff Palace in Gentofte north of Copenhagen.

Romance and marriage
Prince Aage carried on a passionate flirtation with Princess Marie Bonaparte, the wife of his cousin Prince George of Greece and Denmark, who had also enjoyed intimacies with his father. In neither case does it appear that Prince George objected, or felt obliged to give the matter any attention. In 1909 Prince Aage joined the Danish Army, and by 1913 had risen to the rank of lieutenant. During World War I he served as an observer in Italy for a year. Returning home to Denmark he was promoted to captain.

Without the legally required permission of the Danish king, Aage married Matilda Calvi dei conti di Bergolo (Buenos Aires, 17 September 1885 – Copenhagen, 16 October 1949), daughter of Carlo Giorgio Lorenzo Calvi, 5th Count di Bergolo by his wife Baroness Anna Guidobono Calvalchini Roero San Severino, in Turin on 1 February 1914. A few days later, he renounced his place in the line of succession to the Danish throne, forfeiting the title "Prince of Denmark" and the style of Royal Highness (the latter having only been granted to him and his brothers by the king on 5 February 1904). With the king's authorisation, he assumed the title "Prince Aage, Greve af (Count of) Rosenborg" and the style of Highness on 5 February 1914. Although the comital title in the Danish nobility was made hereditary for all of his legitimate descendants in the male line with the rank and precedence (above other counts) of a Lensgreve, use of the princely prefix was restricted to himself and his wife alone. Aage and Mathilde had one son:

Valdemar Alexander Georg Luigi Maria, Count of Rosenborg (Turin, 3 January 1915 – Paris, 1 April 1995) he married  Baroness Marie-Josephe Floria d'Huart Saint-Mauris on 20 April 1949.

Prince Aage was among the people considered for the position of King of Finland in 1918. In the early 1920s he mentioned to  Gustaf Idman, the Finnish ambassador to Denmark, that upon visiting Copenhagen in September 1918, Finnish General Carl Gustav Emil Mannerheim had inquired about his willingness to accept the Finnish crown, should it be offered to him. According to Idman, he was willing to accept the offer.

Foreign Legion

In 1922, Aage received permission from the King, as required by Danish law, to leave the Danish army in order to join the French Foreign Legion. After negotiations between the Danish and the French governments Prince Aage entered the Foreign Legion with the rank of captain.

He was sent to Morocco as part of the French involvement in the Rif War within a year of service. He received the Croix de Guerre after being shot in the left leg. During his seventeen years in the Foreign Legion Prince Aage attained the rank of lieutenant colonel, and also received France's highest order, the Légion d'honneur.

In 1927 he published the book A Royal Adventurer in the Foreign Legion in English about his time in the Foreign Legion.

Death
Prince Aage died of pleurisy in Taza, Morocco, in 1940, and was buried at the French Foreign Legion's headquarters at Sidi Bel Abbès, Algeria. 

Before the Foreign Legion left Algeria in 1962, it was decided that the remains of three selected soldiers should be buried near the new headquarters of the Foreign Legion at Aubagne in southern France. The remains of Prince Aage were selected as the representation of the foreign officers in the Foreign Legion. His remains now lie next to those of Général Paul-Frédéric Rollet (known as the Father of the Legion) and Légionnaire Zimmermann in the town of Puyloubier, France.

Honours
He received the following orders and decorations:

Ancestors

References

Citations

Bibliography

 
 

1887 births
1940 deaths
Officers of the French Foreign Legion
People of the Rif War
Danish princes
House of Glücksburg (Denmark)
Counts of Rosenborg
Disinherited European royalty
Danish military officers
Recipients of the Cross of Honour of the Order of the Dannebrog
Chevaliers of the Légion d'honneur
Recipients of the Croix de guerre des théâtres d'opérations extérieures
Honorary Knights Grand Cross of the Royal Victorian Order